Earth and Fire were a Dutch rock and pop band. Formed in the Netherlands by twin brothers Chris and Gerard Koerts, and most popular from 1970, after adding a female singer, turning frontwoman, Jerney Kaagman.

Earth and Fire's first eight singles were a practically uninterrupted string of top-5 hits in the Netherlands (1970-1974). Also charting in continental Europe, primarily in neighboring Belgium and Germany, the band never gained much popularity in the United Kingdom or the United States. After moving to pop, their biggest hit was "Weekend" (1979), a number one disco track in the Netherlands, Denmark, Germany, Portugal and Switzerland.

History

Early history: The Singing Twins and The Swinging Strings
Earth and Fire originated with the brothers Chris and Gerard Koerts from Voorschoten. As "The Singing Twins" they made music for family and friends since 1960, achieving a breakthrough of sorts at a talent show in 1962, at which future bass player Hans Ziech was present--Ziech, at the time, was already interested in rock and roll and thought The Singing Twins a bit on the mild side, Jan & Kjeld-like. In 1963, influenced by beat music, they joined a local beat band, playing mostly instrumental music until early 1965; the Koerts brothers were remembered as musical perfectionists even at an early age. They changed their name to The Swinging Strings in 1965 and began singing, covering hits by the Beatles, the Byrds, and others. They played regularly and saved enough money to buy equipment and add three female dancers. While they played all over the provinces of North and South Holland, they rarely performed in their own area as The Hague had its own scene of beat bands. By the end of 1966, however, they had won a few talent shows near their home town, had a fan club with over 250 members, and had drawn the attention of radio DJ Willem van Kooten.

Opus Gainfull, transition to Earth and Fire

By 1967 the Koerts brothers were dissatisfied with playing cover music and were looking to increase the technical level of their music. Somewhat abruptly, according to the other members, they broke up the Strings and renamed the band Opus Gainfull, and were looking for a rhythm section. They found a bass player in Hans Ziech (born 1943) of the local band The Soul, and also picked up that band's drummer, Cees Kalis. The Soul's guitar player, Eric Wenink, also joined, for a couple of years. Throughout 1968 and 1969 the band practiced new music, while listening to the music of Jimi Hendrix, Moby Grape, Jefferson Airplane. The decision was made to look for a singer, and Manuela Berloth joined them.

Meanwhile, their music continued to evolve, with ideas for concept albums brought in from the US West Coast and improvisational practice sessions. In 1968, before a show in Beverwijk, the band's name was changed to Earth and Fire. The band recorded two songs as the prize for winning a talent show in 1969, but were not offered a record contract; by the end of the year, Berloth, who in Gerard Koerts' words "was not a rock 'n roll woman", left. The Koerts brothers, who were graduating school at the time, took over on vocals, and the band continued touring, opening for established beat band Golden Earring. In September 1969, they met and hired Jerney Kaagman.

The band's first album, Earth and Fire (1970), produced three hits: "Seasons" reached no. 2 in the Dutch charts, with an estimated 60,000 copies sold; the second single, "Ruby Is the One" (later covered by the Claw Boys Claw for Hitkillers) reached no. 4 and sold 40,000 copies.

By 1977, after four albums and nine hits, particularly songs such as "Memories" (which became their first number one single) and "Maybe Tomorrow, Maybe Tonight", the band found the Dutch musical atmosphere had changed considerably: new bands, influenced by disco, punk, and new wave, threatened to render many of the previously popular Dutch groups obsolete. They therefore moved away from the heavier pop sound they had been making and moved to a more mainstream style, focusing on Disco. 1977's Gate to Infinity suffered a cool reception and the album's lead single, "78th Avenue", failed to break into the Dutch top 10. Drummer Ton van der Kleij left in August 1978, followed shortly thereafter by bass player Theo Hurts. Despite rumors that Kaagman would go solo or take a job at TopPop (the leading pop-music TV-show in Holland and Flanders), she stayed with the Koerts brothers, who quickly found another drummer, Ab Tamboer, and another bass player, Bert Ruiter (Kaagman's partner in life and formerly with Focus). In 1979 they achieved their second number one single "Weekend", but soon afterwards, Chris Koerts left, feeling that he had achieved everything he wanted with the band.

The band split in 1983, with Kaagman moving onto a solo career, before a short lived reunion in 1987. Later, Kaagman became a judge on the very successful Dutch "Idols" adaptation of the Idols franchise. Gerard Koerts died in 2019.

Personnel

Members 

Gerard Koerts - keyboards, backing vocals, flute (1968–1983; died 2019)
Chris Koerts - guitars, backing vocals (1968–1979; died 2022)
Hans Ziech - bass (1968–1974)
Cees Kalis - drums (1968–1970; died 2006)
Manuela Berloth - lead vocals (1968–1969)
 Jerney Kaagman - lead vocals (1969–1983, 1987–1990)
Ton van der Kleij - drums, backing vocals, percussion (1970–1978; died 2015)
Theo Hurts - bass, guitar (1974–1978)

 Bert Ruiter - bass (1978–1983, 1987–1990; died 2022)
Ab Tamboer - drums, percussion (1978–1983, 1987–1990; died 2016)
Johan Slager - guitars (1979–1980)
Ronnie Meyjes - guitars (1980–1983)
Age Kat - guitars (1987–1990)
Jons Pistoor - keyboards (1987–1990)
Ton Scherpenzeel - keyboards (1987–1990)
Mark Stoop - drums (1990)

Timeline

Discography

Albums
 Earth and Fire (1970)
 Song of the Marching Children (1971)
 Atlantis (1973)
 To the World of the Future (1975)
 Rock Sensation (1975 COMPILATION)
 Gate to Infinity (1977)
 Reality Fills Fantasy (1979)
 Andromeda Girl (1981)
 In a State of Flux (1982)
 Phoenix (1989)
 Greatest Hits (CD) (1991)
 Wild And Exciting (1999 compilation)
 The Ultimate Collection (3CD) (2003)

Singles

References

Bibliography

External Links
 
 

Dutch progressive rock groups
Musical groups from South Holland
Voorschoten
Musical groups established in 1968
1968 establishments in the Netherlands
Musical groups disestablished in 1983
1983 disestablishments in the Netherlands
Musical groups reestablished in 1987
1987 establishments in the Netherlands
Musical groups disestablished in 1990
1990 disestablishments in the Netherlands